CNBC Asia is a business news television channel owned by NBCUniversal. It is the Asian service of CNBC (Consumer News and Business Channel). Its programmes originate from Singapore. It was officially opening ceremony at grand opening or formally opening breakfast in Singapore on 20 June 1995 at 6:00am SST based in Singapore and it operated from CNBC Asia's head office and headquarters in Singapore. Currently, it provides business and market information to 385 million people globally.

History

1995–1997: pre-ABN merger
CNBC Asia was officially opened by President of Singapore Ong Teng Cheong on 20 June 1995 at 6:00am SST along with sister channel NBC Asia. It was originally based in Singapore under Television Corporation of Singapore (TCS) after Asia Business News along with a Jakarta and Kuala Lumpur bureau and reporters based across the region. Anchors such as Rico Hizon, Bernard Lo, Lorraine Hahn, Sumire Sugimoto, Dalton Tanonaka and Bill Hartley were part of the original CNBC Asia team which includes around 170 Singapore based staff. It adopted similar programmes from its US counterpart, such as The Money Wheel and Business Tonight, but also had a few of its own programmes as well. In addition, from launch the channel broadcast programmes from CNBC Europe during the afternoon and CNBC US overnight.

Post-ABN merger
In December 1997, Dow Jones & Company and NBC announced the merger of their international business news channels. This resulted in a merger of CNBC Asia with Dow Jones' Asia Business News (ABN) and likewise of CNBC Europe with European Business News. The officially merged channel launched on 31 January 1998 at 11:59pm SST and was officially initially named CNBC Asia Business News but it was officially referred to as CNBC Asia on 30 June 1998 at 11:59pm SST. As a result of the merger, there were massive employee lay-offs and programme cancellations at CNBC's Asia original headquarters in Singapore but Rico Hizon, Geoff Cutmore and Bernard Lo joined the newly merged channel whose operations have been based in Singapore ever since. Programmes and personalities came mostly from ABN and were for the most part retained in their original form (i.e., title and graphics scheme). CNBC Asia also mainly used ABN's own graphics scheme rather than adopt those in use by CNBC US and CNBC Europe. In addition, there was no regional ticker for most audiences until 26 October 1998 and simulcasts of US and European programmes were very limited.

From then (until January 2006) the international CNBC services carried the tagline "A Service of NBC Universal and Dow Jones" (or depending on other local partners, a variation of this tagline) when introducing regional programmes (including magazine programmes) and airing general channel promotions.

Mid-1998–2002
On 1 June 1998, CNBC Asia added CNBC Sports which it aired weekend afternoons and in October 1998, it also started airing selected episodes of The Tonight Show with Jay Leno and Late Night with Conan O'Brien on weekend evenings as NBC Asia was replaced by the National Geographic Channel. When CNBC Asia launched its regional ticker in 1998, it introduced new shows such as Lunch Money (later replaced by Power Lunch Asia in 1999) and Market Watch (later renamed Global Market Watch) where the latter was produced by CNBC Europe but anchored from both London and Singapore. In addition, the channel substantially increased CNBC Europe programming in the afternoon by airing Europe Today in its entirety.

In October 1999, CNBC Asia had a partnership with the Australian Financial Review to present The Australian Financial Review Market Wrap, a daily round-up of market news from the Australian region hosted by James Walker and Grace Phan.

Major programming changes occurred on 30 October 2000 with CNBC Asia expanding Asia Squawk Box to two hours, Asia Market Watch to two hours in the morning and 1½ hours in the afternoon and Power Lunch Asia to one full hour. CNBC Asia's ticker was also reformatted on that day to include colours reflecting change in the stock prices (green for an increase and red for a decrease) and a stock's ticker symbol.

In 2001, CNBC Asia introduced localised tickers to audiences in Australia, Hong Kong and Singapore and has since kept the ticker on the screen during commercial breaks.

In July 2001, Asia Squawk Box was further extended to three hours and more programming hours from CNBC US and CNBC Europe were added to the line-up. This was further extended in 2002 when US programming started at 20.00 SIN time uninterrupted on weeknights.

2006: full control by NBC Universal
In July 2005, it was announced that NBC Universal would take full control of CNBC Asia from 31 December 2005, subject to clearance. The channel's main sequences reverted from "CNBC Asia - A Service of NBC Universal and Dow Jones" to simply "CNBC Asia" on 1 January 2006. But, on 30 October 2006, to further distinguish itself between its other counterparts, "CNBC Asia" simply rebranded itself as "CNBC", and adopting CNBC's new general slogan, "First in Business Worldwide".

2007 programming revamp
During the week of 19 March 2007, CNBC Asia commenced promotions for Squawk Australia, hosted by James, which debuted on 26 March 2007 from a studio in Sydney. It aired from 9.00 Sydney time/6.00 SIN time weekdays. A revamped Asia Squawk Box, anchored by Amanda Drury and Martin Soong, followed at 7.00 SIN time weekdays.

CNBC also launched two brand new shows that replaced Market Watch and the CNBC Europe programme Today's Business. CNBC's Cash Flow, anchored by Maura Fogarty (first hour) and Amanda Drury (second hour), was originally intensely trader and investor based. Following on from the success of Worldwide Exchange, another joint production, Capital Connection was launched. It was originally anchored by Maura Fogarty in Singapore, and Steve Sedgwick in London. Unlike Worldwide Exchange, which was originally produced by CNBC Europe (until production of that show was relocated to CNBC US on 4 January 2016), Capital Connection is produced by CNBC Asia.

On 27 September 2007, CNBC Asia announced strategic initiatives to push into the Australian market. Two new shows were introduced to the network: Trading Matters, a wrap-up of the day's market action, and Australia This Week, a concise show summarizing the week's highlights. Both shows are anchored by then-newly appointed CNBC anchor Oriel Morrison, formerly of Channel Nine and Bloomberg Television. The shows debuted on 2 and 6 October 2007 respectively at 17.30 Sydney time/15.30 SIN time as the channel moved its Sydney bureau into a new studio situated across from the Australian Stock Exchange building. The move has also seen CNBC Australia re-introduce opt-outs from the pan-Asian feed for additional airings of Trading Matters and Australia This Week.

2007: new studio new look in Sydney
It was announced on 5 March 2007 that CNBC Asia would be opening a bureau in Sydney to track the Australian markets. This was in light of the recent global market correction. Squawk Box has had reports from Jeffrey James (a former Business Presenter with Deutsche Welle DW-TV) who was also the original anchor of Squawk Australia. James was the first on-camera presence from CNBC since Mark Laudi returned to Singapore from Sydney. James anchored Squawk Australia from an opening location on the 11th floor of Sydney's General Electric headquarters (NAB House) from early 2007 whilst a new studio was being constructed in nearby Bridge Street. He left the show in October 2008. In 2007, Oriel Morrison also joined the Sydney bureau to give reports during the afternoon session there. She anchored a 30-minute afternoon show for CNBC called Trading Matters.

On 7 January 2008, Foxtel spun off a business channel from Sky News Australia called Sky News Business Channel (named after Fox Business Network in the United States).

In August 2008, The Daily Telegraph reported that Channel Nine's finance reporter Karen Tso, would be joining the network in October 2008. She became the network's Sydney-based correspondent and anchored Squawk Australia, thus replacing Jeffrey James.

In mid-2009, CNBC launched a new personal finance show, The Barefoot Investor, with Australian personal finance expert Scott Pape. This is similar to The Suze Orman Show and is seen on the Australian feed during weekends.

2010: new studio new look
On 14 June 2010, CNBC Asia moved to a new studio inside the Singapore Exchange. The new studio features a rear projection wall that principally gives an overview of regional market action (very similar to what CNBC Europe has).  The left side of the studio has three LCD screens where a reporter stands beside to feature one story or highlight per screen.  CNBC Asia also adopted the graphics package that CNBC US and CNBC Europe have been using since 2 March 2010.  CNBC also premièred another production hub in Bahrain.  This hub is used by presenters to report on Middle East business and is one of the three locations from which Capital Connection is presented.

2014: Picture format change to 16:9
Started from 30 March 2014, CNBC Asia changed its picture format to 16:9 as a standard broadcast format. CNBC Europe followed suit on 31 March 2014. Both networks debuted a then-new, updated graphics package, including new lower-thirds. This on-air style did not carry over to CNBC US, which still had the old on-air style used from 1 March 2010 to 10 October 2014. CNBC US also switched its own picture format to 16:9 on 13 October 2014.

2015–present
On 9 February 2015, CNBC Asia once again updated its graphics package, this time with new titles and new theme music that was based on the US version used since 13 October 2014. Exactly a month later (9 March 2015), its sister network in Europe followed suit. This new on-air style, which is designed by Magoo 3D Studios, matched its US counterpart. Except for Asia Squawk Box and Capital Connection, all of the programmes share the same theme music, which is different from US and Europe versions (each of their programmes have their individual music).

On 29 October 2018, Street Signs was expanded to three hours due to the cancellation of The Rundown, which also resulted in Asia Squawk Box returning to the previous 6-9am SIN timeslot.

Programming

2014 programming revamp
During the week of 31 March 2014, CNBC launched two brand new shows that replaced The Call and Cash Flow. These were early morning show The Rundown and Street Signs replaced Cash Flow.

Weekday line-up
CNBC Asia produces live business day programming from 6 am to 1 pm SIN time during DST or 6 am to 2 pm without DST (also SIN time). The channel's weekday business day programmes (pan-Asian feed) are
 Asia Squawk Box – Sri Jegarajah and Martin Soong 
 Street Signs – Tanvir Gill and Teymoor Nabili
 Capital Connection – Dan Murphy and Hadley Gamble

In addition, CNBC Asia produces a weekly show - Managing Asia, presented by Christine Tan (Friday only)

Weekends
CNBC Asia broadcasts lifestyle and sporting programmes, branded under CNBC Life, showings of CNBC US documentaries and weekly business shows such as Managing Asia, Investing Asia, Investing Edge, Access: Middle East, Suze Orman, Inside China and On the Money. Back-to-back editions of The Tonight Show starring Jimmy Fallon are shown during the evening.

End-of-year programming

On trading days over the Christmas and new year period, CNBC Asia massively cuts back its regional programming, replacing it with pre-taped specials with live output restricted to a two-hour edition of Asia Squawk Box.  Simulcasts of programmes originating from CNBC US and CNBC Europe remain unaffected.  Regular programming resumes immediately after the New Year's Day holiday.

Former programmes
Among the shows that have been cancelled are:

Weekdays
 Lunch Money (2 February 1998 – 29 October 1999, replaced by Power Lunch Asia on 1 November 1999)
 Breakfast Briefing (2 February 1998 – 31 March 2000, replaced by CNBC Today on 3 April 2000)
 Trading Day (2 February 1998 – 31 March 2000, replaced by Asia Market Watch and European Market Watch on 3 April 2000)
 Asia Nightly News (2 February 1998 – 30 June 2000, replaced by e on 3 July 2000)
 Global Market Watch (3 April 2000 – 27 October 2000, replaced by Business Center on 30 October 2000)
 The Australian Financial Review Market Wrap (1 November 1999 – 29 December 2000, replaced by Australia Market Wrap)
 CNBC Today (3 April 2000 – 15 March 2002, replaced by Asia Wake Up Call on 18 March 2002)
 Wake Up Call (18 March 2002 – 28 March 2003, replaced by Asia Squawk Box on 31 March 2003)
 Power Lunch Asia (1 November 1999 – 28 March 2003, replaced by Meet The Press and US Business Center on 31 March 2003 after Rico Hizon's leave)
 Australia Market Wrap (1 January 2001 – 2 January 2004)
 Australia Market Week (6 April 2001 – 2 January 2004)
 Business Centre Australia (January 2001 – 2 January 2004)
 Business Center (30 October 2000 – 15 February 2005, replaced by CNBC Tonight)
 e (5 April 2000 – 15 February 2005, replaced by CNBC Tonight)
 The Asian Wall Street Journal (2 February 1998 – 15 February 2005, replaced by CNBC Tonight)
 Asia Market Wrap (2 February 1998 – 2 December 2005, replaced by Squawk Box Europe then Worldwide Exchange on 19 December 2005)
 CNBC Tonight (16 February 2005 – 16 December 2005, replaced by Worldwide Exchange)
 Market Watch (3 April 2000 – 23 March 2007, replaced by CNBC's Cash Flow and Asia Squawk Box on 26 March 2007)
 Cash Flow (originally CNBC's Cash Flow, then Cash Flow From Australia; 26 March 2007 – 28 March 2014, replaced by Street Signs)
 The Call (14 June 2010 – 28 March 2014)
 The Rundown (31 March 2014 – 26 October 2018)

Primetime and weekends
 Generation e (replaced by CNBC Tonight)
 CEO Australia
 dot.commerce (replaced by e in April 2000)
 Far Eastern Economic Review or Review On Air (cancelled in April 2001)
 Driven (cancelled in 2000)
 Over Asia (cancelled in 1999)
 New Company
 Lo & Company
 Asian Working Woman (cancelled in April 2001)
 Smart Money (cancelled in 2000)
 Challenging Asia (cancelled in 2000)
 Storyboard (cancelled 29 October 2000)
 Asia This Week (cancelled in March 2003 after Rico Hizon's leave)
 Inside China

Sports coverage
 Golf Channel (Golf on NBC)
 PGA Tour
 Masters Tournament
 PGA Championship
 U.S. Open
 The Open Championship (British Open)
 European Tour
 Asian Tour

Simulcasts outside the region
In the US, all of CNBC Asia's daytime programmes are seen on CNBC World.

In Europe, during the mid to late 2000s CNBC Europe had chosen to scale back simulcasts of CNBC Asia programming overnight in favour of teleshopping and later poker games and CNBC Asia's entire morning line-up had only been seen on Monday mornings. During the rest of the week, only the second hour of Street Signs and Capital Connection were seen on CNBC Europe. However, in 2009, CNBC Europe began showing almost the entire CNBC Asia schedule throughout the week.

Since 23 April 2007, a free live and commercial-free stream of CNBC Asia has been available on CNBC.com every Monday, from 6AM to 4PM SIN time (Sundays 6PM to 4AM ET with DST).  At other times, the stream can be accessed by subscribing to CNBC Plus, which costs $9.95/month or $99.95/year.

Furthermore, Worldwide Exchange is not shown on Fridays due to clashing with weekend shows (Inside China, The Edge) and Managing Asia.

CNBC Asia ticker
During the trading day, CNBC Asia runs a ticker providing information from major Asian stock exchanges, as well as US and Europe recaps.  The top bar usually features the Most Active shares in the region while the bottom bar gives the latest data on indices, currencies, commodities and the treasury market.  At night, the old CNBC US ticker is simulated where only the ticker symbols are displayed instead of the companies' full names.  The ticker is shown continuously during commercial breaks and most of the data for the Asian ticker is supplied by Reuters.

Viewers in Singapore and Australia are treated to a more localised ticker with the top bar featuring trades from their respective local stock markets exclusively.

Outside Asia, the ticker can be seen alongside CNBC Asia programmes simulcasted on CNBC Europe and CNBC World.  However, the ticker is not available on CNBC Asia's live stream at CNBC.com (both freeview and CNBC Plus) and is instead replaced by a similar looking static strip which says "CNBC" on the top bar and its tagline "First in Business Worldwide" on the lower bar.

On-air staff

Staff are based in Singapore unless stated otherwise.

Current
 Amanda Drury (Sydney)
 Tanvir Gill
 Sri Jegarajah
 Chery Kang (Hong Kong)
 Will Koulouris – Japan market reporter
 Teymoor Nabili
 JP Ong
 Martin Soong 
 Emily Tan (Hong Kong) – senior correspondent covering China, Hong Kong and Taiwan markets
 Christine Tan
 Samantha Vadas – China correspondent
 Eunice Yoon (Beijing) – chief China correspondent

Former

Anchors/presenters

 Andrea Catherwood (now presenting and contributing to programmes in the UK)
 Aaron Heslehurst (now with BBC World News)
 Rico Hizon (later with BBC World News, now with CNN Philippines)
 Nancy Hungerford (left CNBC on July 2, 2021)
 Fauziah Ibrahim (now with ABC News (Australia))
 Jeffrey James (now based in China)
 Mark Laudi (now runs his own consultancy, Mark Laudi and Associates)
 May Lee (her "Oprah"-style talk show on STAR World premiered in May 2008)
 Susan Li (moved to CNBC Europe and later to CNBC US; left in August 2017, now with Fox Business)
 Bernard Lo
 Dalton Tanonaka (now with Metro TV)
 Karen Tso (now based at CNBC Europe as co-anchor of Squawk Box Europe)

Correspondents

 Tracey Chang (now with CCTV)
 Geoff Cutmore (now with CNBC Europe, hosting Squawk Box Europe)
 Stephen Engle (now with Bloomberg Television as their Beijing correspondent)
 Cheng Lei (journalist) (arrested in February 2021 "on suspicion of illegally supplying state secrets overseas")
 Betty Liu (later with Bloomberg Television, New York studios; left the television industry in May 2018)
 Jane Ong (now with Burson-Marsteller Asia Pacific)
 Colette Wong (later with Fox Sports Asia and Fox Sports News Asia until its demise in September 2021)

Other CNBC Asia Services and partnerships

CNBC-based channels
In conjunction with local partners it provides the following local channels:
 CNBC TV18 (in India, formerly CNBC India)
 CNBC Infinitey (in India)
 CNBC Awaaz (in India)
 CNBC Bajar (in India)
 CNBC Prime (in India)
 CNBC Tamilin (in India)
 Nikkei CNBC (in Japan)
 CNBC Pakistan (now closed)
 SBS-CNBC (in Korea)
 CNBC Indonesia (in Indonesia)
 JKN-CNBC (in Thailand)

Other TV and print partners
 Seoul Broadcasting System (SBS) (in South Korea)
 Formerly MBN CNBC was also provided in Korea. However CNBC Asia and MBN agreed to dissolve their partnership in July 2005.
 From January 2010. SBS CNBC is provided. This channel is managed with Seoul Broadcasting System (SBS).
 In the Philippines, the second hour of CNBC's Street Signs is simulcasted on ANC.  Managing Asia is also shown on ANC at 8.30 local time on Saturdays. However, ANC and CNBC ended their partnership in 2016. In 2001-2002 CNBC on ZOE TV (now A2Z) in 24/7 Business News Channel on Free TV.
 Even after Dow Jones Newswires had sold its stake to NBC Universal, correspondents from Dow Jones Newswires and The Wall Street Journal Asia continued contributing to the channel.

Airline partners
Managing Asia can be seen on Singapore Airlines and Jet Airways.

Mobile services and podcasts
CNBC Asia also delivers financial news to mobile phone users by keying in https://web.archive.org/web/20080807115257/http://asia.cnbc.com/.  Subscribers in Singapore's M1, Indonesia's Telkomsel and Cambodia's Mobitel can see live streaming of the channel and selected on-demand clips from its shows.

The channel also offers podcasts free-of-charge.

Taglines
 "Capitalize On It" (1 January 2015 – present)
 "First in Business Worldwide" (1 January 1996–31 January/30 June 1998, 28 October 2006 – present)
 "The World Leader in Business News" (1 January 2006 – 27 October 2006)
 "Now More Than Ever" (1 July 2002 – 31 December 2002)
 "Profit from it" (30 October 2000 – 31 December 2005)
 "The World is Asia Business" (1 January 1999 - 31 December 1999)
 "Business Intelligence" (1 February/30 June 1998 – 29 October 2000)
 "A Service of NBCUniversal and Dow Jones" (1 February/1 July 1998 – 31 December 2005, 1 January 2007 – present)

References

External links
 CNBC Asia official site

 
CNBC global channels
Television channels and stations established in 1995
English-language television stations
Television in Singapore
Television stations in Singapore
Broadcasting in Singapore
Mass media in Singapore
Mass media in Southeast Asia
Television news in Singapore
1995 establishments in Singapore